Nagina Assembly constituency is one of the 403 constituencies of the Uttar Pradesh Legislative Assembly, India. It is a part of the Bijnor district and one of the five assembly constituencies in the Nagina Lok Sabha constituency. First election in this assembly constituency was held in 1957 after the delimitation order (DPACO - 1956) was passed in 1956. The constituency was assigned identification number 18 after "Delimitation of Parliamentary and Assembly Constituencies Order, 2008" was passed in the year 2008.

Wards / Areas
Extent of Nagina Assembly constituency is KCs Akbarabad, Kiratpur & Kiratpur MB of Najibabad Tehsil; KC Nagina & Nagina MB of Nagina Tehsil.

Members of the Legislative Assembly

Election results

2022

2017

2012

See also

List of Vidhan Sabha constituencies of Uttar Pradesh
Bijnor district

References

External links
 

Assembly constituencies of Uttar Pradesh
Politics of Bijnor district
Constituencies established in 1956
1956 establishments in Uttar Pradesh